Summer Is Over is a 1963 Soviet comedy film directed by Nikita Orlov and Rolan Bykov.

Plot 
Sportsman-cyclist, jack of all trades Valera Bulyshev and dumbass Zheka Ruchkin are Muscovites and bosom friends. Their parents send them on summer vacations to the small town  Kurepka to visit Valery's three aunts, who have never seen their nephew before.

Valery does not want to spend the whole summer with his old, boring, as he believes, aunts, and tries to get a job on an expedition to a random travel companion. Zheka has to go to his aunts and pretend to be their nephew, although they are the complete opposite of each other. But the  expedition  turns out to be an ordinary carriage of goods along the river, and Valery is forced to return to Kurepka too. However, on the way to the house, Valery, not knowing his aunts by sight, manages to come into conflict with all of them. And now he is forced to hide in the attic of the aunts' house, and Zheka has to continue to impersonate Valery.

But it turns out that the aunts are not boring at all, but very energetic and loved by everyone in the town. Zheka has fun and interesting time in their company, and Valery has to be bored in the attic.

After going through a whole series of funny and ridiculous adventures, Zheka becomes skillful and independent and even wins a bicycle race, not even being able to ride before, and Valery completely changes his unfair opinion about his aunts and receives their complete forgiveness.

Cast 
 Vladimir Yevstafyev as Zheka Ruchkin 
  Sergei Gudko as Valera Bulyshev 
 Zoya Fyodorova as aunt Dasha
 Antonina Dmitrieva as aunt Masha
 Lyudmila Chernyshyova as aunt Sasha 
 Aleksandr Lebedev as policeman Muravey
 Yakov Lents as Head of the post office / Bridge worker
 Mikhail Pugovkin as Chief forwarder
 Sergey Filippov as Nikolay Erofeevich Bulyshev
 Rolan Bykov as shopper in a straw hat
 Pavel Pavlenko as Yevgeny Alexandrovich Ruchkin, Zheka's grandfather

References

External links 
 

1963 films
1960s Russian-language films
Soviet comedy films
1963 comedy films
Soviet black-and-white films
Mosfilm films
Soviet adventure comedy films
Russian children's comedy films
Films directed by Rolan Bykov
Soviet children's films